Bogdan Nicolae Dănăricu (born 20 January 1995) is a Romanian professional footballer who plays as a midfielder for Gilortul Târgu Cărbunești.

References

External links
 
 

1995 births
Living people
Sportspeople from Târgu Jiu
Romanian footballers
Association football midfielders
Liga I players
Liga II players
CS Pandurii Târgu Jiu players
SSU Politehnica Timișoara players